Kenneth Spencer Yalowitz (born May 28, 1941) is an American retired diplomat. A Foreign Service Officer, he twice served as a U.S. Ambassador and is a Wilson Center Global Fellow.

Early life and education
Yalowitz was born on May 28, 1941. He graduated from Columbia University with a M.Phil and the University of Wisconsin-Madison with a B.A.

Career
During Yalowitz’s 36 year career with the Foreign Service, Yalowitz served as Ambassador to Belarus from 1994-1997 and Georgia from 1998-2001. He received the “Ambassador Robert Frasure award for peacemaking and conflict prevention in 2000 for his work preventing spillover of the Chechen war into Georgia.” As an academic, he’s served as Director of the Dickey Center for International Understanding at Dartmouth College and as an adjunct professor at several universities including Georgetown University (Director of the Conflict Resolution MA Program) and Washington and Lee University. Yalowitz was elected to the  American Academy of Diplomacy in 2009.

References

1941 births
Living people
United States Foreign Service personnel
Columbia University alumni
University of Wisconsin–Madison alumni
Ambassadors of the United States to Belarus
Ambassadors of the United States to Georgia (country)
Georgetown University faculty
Dartmouth College people
Washington and Lee University faculty